Area code 456 was a non-geographic numbering plan area code (NPA) used until 2017 to route inbound calls from outside the territories of the North American Numbering Plan to specific carriers for carrier-specific services.

In November 2017, NPA 456 was withdrawn because of lack of demand. The code is scheduled to be returned to the pool of unassigned NPAs in 2023.

See also
 List of NANP area codes

References

External links
 NANPA Numbering Resources - 456-NXX Assignments

456